Rudolf Stahl (11 February 1912 – 7 June 1984) was a German field handball player who competed in the 1936 Summer Olympics.

He was part of the German field handball team that won the gold medal. He played in two matches, including the final.

External links
Rudolf Stahl's profile at databaseOlympics.com
Rudolf Stahl's profile at Sports Reference.com

1912 births
1984 deaths
Field handball players at the 1936 Summer Olympics
German male handball players
Olympic gold medalists for Germany
Olympic handball players of Germany
Olympic medalists in handball
Medalists at the 1936 Summer Olympics